Corbin is a masculine given name. Notable people with the name include:

 Corbin Allred (born 1979), American actor
 Corbin Bernsen (born 1954), American actor
 Corbin Bleu (born 1989), American actor of Jamaican and Italian descent
 Corbin Burnes (born 1994), American professional baseball pitcher
 Corbin Harney (1920–2007), elder and spiritual leader of the Newe (Western Shoshone) people
 Corbin Kaufusi (born 1993), American football player
 Corbin Lacina (born 1970), former American football offensive lineman
 Corbin Tomaszeski, Canadian restaurant consultant and celebrity chef
 Corbin Waller (born 1985), American soccer player
 Corbin (musician) (born 1998 as Corbin Smidzik), American singer

English masculine given names
Masculine given names